Pitcairnia lanuginosa is a plant species in the genus Pitcairnia. This species is native to Bolivia and Brazil.

References

lanuginosa
Flora of Bolivia
Flora of Brazil